Targum Jonathan, otherwise referred to as Targum Yonasan/Yonatan, is the official eastern (Babylonian) targum (Aramaic translation) to the Nevi'im ("prophets"). 

It is not to be confused with "Targum Pseudo-Jonathan", an Aramaic translation of the Torah, which is often known as "Targum Jonathan" due to a printer's error.

Origin

It originated, like Targum Onkelus for the Torah, in the synagogue reading of a translation from the Prophets, together with the weekly lesson.

The Talmud attributes its authorship to Jonathan ben Uzziel, a pupil of Hillel the Elder. According to this source, it was composed by Jonathan ben Uzziel "from the mouths of Haggai, Zechariah, and Malachi," implying that it was based on traditions derived from the last prophets. The additional statements that on this account the entire land of Israel was shaken and that a voice from heaven cried: "Who has revealed my secrets to the children of men?" are legendary reflections of the novelty of Jonathan's undertaking, and of the disapprobation which it evoked. The story adds that Jonathan wished to translate the Ketuvim also, but that a heavenly voice bade him to desist. The Targum to Job, which was withdrawn from circulation by Gamaliel I, may have represented the result of his attempts to translate the Ketuvim.

Jonathan ben Uzziel is named as Hillel's most prominent pupil, and the reference to his Targum is at least of historical value, so there is nothing to controvert the assumption that it served as the foundation for the present Targum to the Prophets.

It was thoroughly revised, however, before it was redacted in Babylonia. In the Babylonian Talmud it is quoted with especial frequency by Joseph, head of the Academy of Pumbedita, who says, with reference to two Biblical passages, "If there were no Targum to it we should not know the meaning of these verses". This shows that as early as the beginning of the fourth century the Targum to the Prophets was recognized as of ancient authority.

Hai Gaon apparently regarded Joseph as the author, since he cited passages from it with the words "Rab Joseph has translated".

Linguistic analysis

The language of Targum Jonathan is Aramaic. Its overall style is very similar to that of Targum Onkelos (to the Pentateuch), though at times it seems to be a looser paraphrase of the Biblical text.

It is the result of a single redaction.

Like Targum Onkelos, it gained general recognition in Babylonia in the third century; and from the Babylonian academies it was carried throughout the Diaspora. It originated, however, in the Land of Israel, and was then adapted to the vernacular of Babylonia; so that it contains the same linguistic peculiarities as the Targum Onḳelos, including sporadic instances of Persian words. In cases where the Land of Israel and Babylonian texts differ, this Targum follows the latter.

Although Targum Jonathan was composed in antiquity (probably in the 2nd Century CE), it is now known from medieval manuscripts, which contain many textual variants. The earliest attestation appears as citations of Jer 2:1–2 and Ez 21:23 on an Aramaic Incantation bowl found in Nippur, Babylonia.

Liturgical use
In Talmudic times (and to this day in Yemenite Jewish communities) Targum Jonathan was read as a verse-by-verse translation alternatively with the Hebrew verses of the haftarah in the synagogue. Thus, when the Talmud states that "a person should complete his portions of scripture along with the community, reading the scripture twice and the targum once", the passage may be taken to refer to Targum Jonathan (as well as to Targum Onkelos on the Torah).

See also
Targum
Targum Onkelos
Targum Pseudo-Jonathan
Torah

References

External links
 Original text for Joshua and Judges
 English Translation of the Targumim at The Newsletter for Targumic and Cognate Studies for the Pentateuch, Song of Songs, Ruth, Lamentations, Psalms, Isaiah, and Obadiah
 CAL Targumic Studies Module 
15th century Yemenite manuscript at the British Library 

Jonathan
Hebrew Bible versions and translations
2nd-century texts
Jewish texts in Aramaic